is a railway station on the Nishitetsu Kaizuka Line in Higashi-ku, Fukuoka, Japan, operated by the private railway operator Nishi-Nippon Railroad (Nishitetsu).

Lines 
Kashii-Miyamae Station is served by the Nishitetsu Kaizuka Line.

Station layout 
The elevated station has a side platform serving one track.

Platforms

Adjacent stations

History
The station opened on 1 March 1959.

Surrounding area
Kashii-gū

External links

 Nishitetsu station information 

Railway stations in Fukuoka Prefecture
Railway stations in Japan opened in 1959